Lieutenant General Sharon Patricia Moffat Nesmith (née Moffat; born 1970) is a senior British Army officer. She has been Deputy Chief of the General Staff since August 2022. She became the first woman to command a British Army brigade in 2014, the first woman to command a British division-level formation in 2021, and the first woman to be promoted to lieutenant general in the British Army in 2022.

Personal life
Nesmith is from Northumberland. Her father was an officer in the Royal Naval Reserve, and her brother served in the British Army for 16 years. She studied biological sciences at the University of Edinburgh. She was sponsored through university by the British Army, having been awarded a university cadetship.

Nesmith's husband, Walker, works as a tree surgeon. She has two sons.

Military career

On 4 September 1988, Nesmith was commissioned in the Women's Royal Army Corps of the British Army as a second lieutenant (on probation) as part of her university cadetship. Following university and Sandhurst, she joined the Royal Corps of Signals in 1992. She has served in the Balkans, Iraq and Latvia. She was promoted to colonel on 30 June 2012. 

In August 2014, Nesmith became the first woman to command a British Army brigade when she was chosen to command the 1st Signal Brigade. She was promoted to brigadier on 30 June 2015. Her role was formally announced by Secretary of State for Defence Michael Fallon in September 2015, almost a year after she started in the role. The brigade consists of between 1,500 and 5,000 troops. This was the highest role ever taken by a woman in the British Army. On 1 November 2018, she was appointed Colonel Commandant of the Corps of Royal Electrical and Mechanical Engineers. She was awarded the Medal for Long Service and Good Conduct with one clasp, recognising 25 years of service in the British Army.

General officer
On 8 March 2019, The Times reported that Nesmith was to be appointed as Director (Personnel) at Army Headquarters and will sit on the Army Board. She assumed the appointment on 14 March 2019 and was promoted to major general. On 15 March 2019, she was appointed to the honorary position of Assistant Colonel Commandant of the Adjutant General's Corps: she relinquished the appointment on 6 November 2019. On 1 August 2019, she was appointed Colonel Commandant of the Royal Corps of Signals. She was appointed Master of Signals on 1 October 2020, succeeding General Sir Nick Pope. She became General Officer Commanding of Army Recruiting and Initial Training Command in January 2021. 

It was announced in April 2022 that Nesmith would be the next Deputy Chief of the General Staff, and would thus become the first woman to hold the rank of lieutenant general in the British Army. On 11 August 2022, she took up the role of Deputy Chief of the General Staff and was promoted to lieutenant general.

Interests
Nesmith has been a vice-president of the Army Football Association.

References

|-

Living people
Graduates of the Royal Military Academy Sandhurst
Royal Corps of Signals officers
British Army generals
Alumni of the University of Edinburgh
1970 births
Female army generals
Women in the British Army
Military personnel from Northumberland
Women's Royal Army Corps officers